Vermina was the son of king Syphax, king of Masaesylian Berbers, a Berber tribe of western Numidia which was an ancient Berber kingdom in North Africa.

References

200s BC deaths
3rd-century BC Berber people
Kings of Numidia
People of the Second Punic War
Year of birth missing